Miloš Obradović (Serbian Cyrillic: Милош Oбpaдoвић; born 30 March 1987) is a former Serbian footballer.

External sources
 Profile and stats in Srbijafudbal.

References

1987 births
Living people
People from Ub, Serbia
Serbian footballers
Serbian expatriate footballers
Association football midfielders
FK Spartak Subotica players
FK Borac Čačak players
FK Palić players
OFK Bečej 1918 players
FK Metalac Gornji Milanovac players
FK Mladost Lučani players
FK Palilulac Beograd players
FK Novi Pazar players
OFK Beograd players
FK Voždovac players
FK Rad players
U.D. Leiria players
Primeira Liga players
FC Nitra players
Serbian SuperLiga players
Expatriate footballers in Portugal
Expatriate footballers in Slovakia
Serbian expatriate sportspeople in Portugal
Serbian expatriate sportspeople in Slovakia